South African Journal may refer to

South African Journal of Science
South African Journal of Economics
South African Medical Journal
South African Geographical Journal
South African Law Journal